Steckle is a surname. It may refer to:

Allen Steckle (1872–1938), American football player and coach
Paul Steckle (born 1942), Canadian politician and former Canadian Member of Parliament
Robert Steckle (born 1930), Canadian Greco-Roman and freestyle wrestler

See also
Steckley